Love, Strings and Jobim is a 1966 album by various Brazilian artists who play new Brazilian songs by various composers.  Because Antônio Carlos Jobim is pictured on the cover and mentioned in the title, he has been and continues to be credited to be the performing artist on the album.  Jobim does not appear on the album except as a composer.  The original Brazilian title of this album is "Tom Jobim Apresenta" and it appeared on the Elenco label.

Track listing
 "Eu Preciso de Você" ("Hurry Up and Love Me") (Ray Gilbert, Antônio Carlos Jobim, Aloísio de Oliveira) –2:21
 "Preciso Aprender a Ser Só" ("If You Went Away") (Gilbert, Marcos Valle) –3:09
 "Seu Encanto" ("The Face I Love") (Gilbert, Carlos Pingarilho, Valle) –2:13
 "Tristeza de Nós Dois" ("The Sight of You") (Bebeto, Durval Ferreira, Gilbert, Valentino Mauricio) –3:17
 "Razão de Viver" ("Tears") (Eumir Deodato) –2:44
 "Berimbau" (Vinicius de Moraes, Gilbert, Baden Powell de Aquino) –3:26
 "Samba Torto" ("Pardon My English") (Gilbert, Jobim, Oliveira) –1:57
 "Chuva" ("Rain") (Carargo, Ferreira, Gilbert) –2:18
 "Você" ("You") (Roberto Menescal) –2:15
 "Imagem" ("Image") (Luiz Eça, Gilbert, Oliveira) –1:35
 "Morrer de Amor" ("I Live to Love You") (Oscar Castro-Neves, Luverci Fiorini, Gilbert) –2:55
 "A Morte de Um Deus de Sal" ("Neptune's Hep Tune") (Ronaldo Bôscoli, Gilbert, Menescal) –2:13

Personnel
 Lindolpho Gaya − arranger, conductor
 Eumir Deodato – arranger, piano
 Edison Machado – drums
 Sérgio Barroso − bass
 Oscar Castro-Neves − acoustic guitar
 Mauricio Einhorn − harmonica
 Jorge Ferreira da Silva − alto saxophone, flute

References

1966 compilation albums
Bossa nova albums
Warner Records compilation albums
Compilation albums by Brazilian artists
Albums arranged by Eumir Deodato